The Translation of Ancient Greek Drama in All the Languages of the World is a collection of lectures and essays on the translation of Ancient Greek drama, edited by Helena Patrikiou and published in 1998. The book includes work presented in October 1995 as part of a convention on the translation of Greek drama, in which nearly 40 scholars and translators participated.

Authors and essayists 
The compilation features lectures and essays by Giorgos Aggelinaras, P. Mavromoustakou, Christina Symvoulidou, Walter Puchner, Nikos Chourmouziadēs, A. Feldhuns, G. Giannaris, Pavlos Matesis, E. Chandriotis, Jerzy Łanowski, F.R. de Oliveira and K. Georgosopoulos.

References

1998 non-fiction books
Greek-language books
Essay anthologies
Books of lectures
Ancient Greek theatre
Essays about translation
1998 anthologies